Dasari Yethiraja Sampath Kumar, sometimes known as D. Y. Sampath Kumar (20 November 1927  – 21 May 1999), popularly referred to as "Andhra Jalari" or Fisherman of Andhra Pradesh, was an Indian classical and folk dancer and choreographer. He assimilated the ancient traditions of dance and music of South India under the tutelage of various gurus like Sri Peri Narasimha Shastry who taught him Veena and Duvvuri Jagannadha Sarma who taught him Bharatanatyam. He became an exponent of various dance styles like Bharatanatyam, Kuchipudi, Yakshagana and folk dances. He gave thousands of performances with brilliant embellishments in several states and in many countries.

References

Telugu people
1927 births
1999 deaths
Performers of Indian classical dance
Indian classical choreographers
Dancers from Andhra Pradesh
Indian dance teachers
Bharatanatyam exponents
Indian choreographers
Teachers of Indian classical dance
Educators from Andhra Pradesh
20th-century Indian dancers